Transaldolase 1 is a protein that in humans is encoded by the TALDO1 gene.

Function

Transaldolase 1 is a key enzyme of the nonoxidative pentose phosphate pathway providing ribose-5-phosphate for nucleic acid synthesis and NADPH for lipid biosynthesis. This pathway can also maintain glutathione at a reduced state and thus protect sulfhydryl groups and cellular integrity from oxygen radicals. The functional gene of transaldolase 1 is located on chromosome 11 and a pseudogene is identified on chromosome 1 but there are conflicting map locations. The second and third exon of this gene were developed by insertion of a retrotransposable element. This gene is thought to be involved in multiple sclerosis. [provided by RefSeq, Jul 2008].

References

Further reading